Edbrooke Hill is a hill, 2100 m high, at the extreme west end of the Apocalypse Peaks in Victoria Land. It rises 100 m above the adjacent plateau ice, which diverges at the hill to the east-northeast-flowing Haselton Glacier and the east-flowing Huka Kapo Glacier. Named by the New Zealand Geographic Board in 2005 after Steven Edbrooke, a geologist with the New Zealand Geological Survey, who mapped coal measures at Mount Fleming, Shapeless Mountain and Mount Electra in 1982–83; in upper Wright Valley, Clare Range and Willett Range, 1992–93.

References

Hills of Victoria Land